Lymington was a parliamentary borough in Hampshire, which elected two Members of Parliament (MPs) to the House of Commons from 1584 until 1868, and then one member from 1868 until 1885, when the borough was abolished.

Members of Parliament

1584-1640 
{| class="wikitable"
|-
!Parliament!!First member!!Second member
|-
| 1584|| Anthony Cooke|| Richard Cooke
|-
| 1586 (Oct)|| Francis Keilway|| William Wallop
|-
| 1588 (Oct)|| Francis Keilway|| William White
|-
| 1593||Richard Blount|| John Knight
|-
| 1597 (Oct)|| Thomas West|| Henry Wallop
|-
| 1601 (Oct)|| Sir Francis Darcy|| Thomas Ridley
|-
| 1604|| Thomas Marshal||   Thomas South
|-
| 1614 || Philip Fleming || Charles Thynne
|-
| 1621-1622 || Sir William Doddington ||  Henry Crompton
|-
| 1624|| Nicholas Ferrar ||  John More
|-
| 1625|| John Button|| John Mills
|-
| 1626|| Herbert Doddington|| John More
|-
| 1628–1629|| Herbert Doddington||   Richard Whitehead
|-
| 1629–1640||colspan = "2"| No Parliaments summoned'
|}

 1640-1868 

 1868-1885 

Election results
Elections in the 1830s

 
 

 
 

Elections in the 1840s

 
 
 

 
 

 

 

Elections in the 1850s
Keppel resigned, causing a by-election.

 

 
 

 

 
 

 

 
 

Elections in the 1860s
Carnac's resignation caused a by-election.

 

 Seat reduced to one memberElections in the 1870s

Elections in the 1880s

Notes

 References 
Robert Beatson, A Chronological Register of Both Houses of Parliament (London: Longman, Hurst, Res & Orme, 1807) 
D Brunton & D H Pennington, Members of the Long Parliament (London: George Allen & Unwin, 1954)Cobbett's Parliamentary history of England, from the Norman Conquest in 1066 to the year 1803 (London: Thomas Hansard, 1808) 
F W S Craig, British Parliamentary Election Results 1832-1885 (2nd edition, Aldershot: Parliamentary Research Services, 1989)
 J Holladay Philbin, Parliamentary Representation 1832 - England and Wales'' (New Haven: Yale University Press, 1965)

Lymington
Parliamentary constituencies in Hampshire (historic)
Constituencies of the Parliament of the United Kingdom established in 1584
Constituencies of the Parliament of the United Kingdom disestablished in 1885